The Battle of Shigino, fought in the final months of 1614, was one battle during the Siege of Osaka, a campaign by the Tokugawa shogunate to destroy or subjugate the last resistance to its power, the Toyotomi clan.

History 
Five thousand Tokugawa troops, led by Uesugi Kagekatsu, engaged 2000 troops loyal to the Toyotomi at a place called Shigino, across the Yamato River (now called the Neyagawa) from the site of the Battle of Imafuku, which took place several weeks earlier. The Tokugawa troops received reinforcements from Niwa Nagashige and Horio Tadaharu, whose forces included a number of arquebusiers. They brought orders from the Tokugawa commander, Tokugawa Ieyasu, that Uesugi Kagekatsu should withdraw from the battle and take a rest; Kagekatsu insisted that this was an affront to his honor, as the Uesugi traditionally would not retire from a battle in progress.

References

Turnbull, Stephen (1998). The Samurai Sourcebook. London: Cassell & Co.

Shigeno
1614 in Japan
Shigino